The 1960 Montana Grizzlies football team represented the University of Montana in the 1960 NCAA University Division football season as a member of the Skyline Conference. The Grizzlies were led by third-year head coach Ray Jenkins, played their home games at Dornblaser Field, and finished the season with a record of five wins and five losses (5–5, 2–5 Skyline, fifth).

Montana won its two rivalry games, both played at home in Missoula. For the first time in a decade, the Grizzlies defeated Idaho to recapture the Little Brown Stein, then broke a four-game losing streak to Montana State.

Schedule

References

External links
1960 Grizzly Football Yearbook

Montana
Montana Grizzlies football seasons
Montana Grizzlies football